The women's heptathlon at the 2014 European Athletics Championships took place at the Letzigrund on 14 and 15 August.

Medalists

Records

Schedule

Results

100 metres hurdles
Wind:Heat 1: +0.4 m/s, Heat 2: +0.6 m/s, Heat 3: +0.2 m/s

High jump

Shot put

200 metres
Wind:Heat 1: -0.8 m/s, Heat 2: -0.2 m/s, Heat 3: -0.5 m/s

Long jump

Javelin throw

800 metres

Final standings

References

100m Hurdles
High Jump
Shot Put
200m
Long Jump
Javelin Throw
800m
Final Results

Heptathlon W
Combined events at the European Athletics Championships
2014 in women's athletics